Rushton is a civil parish in the district of Staffordshire Moorlands, Staffordshire, England. It contains 19 listed buildings that are recorded in the National Heritage List for England. Of these, one is at Grade II*, the middle of the three grades, and the others are at Grade II, the lowest grade.  The parish contains the village of Rushton Spencer, and is otherwise rural.  Most of he listed buildings are farmhouses and farm buildings, the other listed buildings include private houses, a church and items in the churchyard, a chapel, a public house, and a former railway station.


Key

Buildings

See also

Listed buildings in Bosley, Cheshire
Listed buildings in Heaton
Listed buildings in Horton
Listed buildings in Biddulph
Listed buildings in Congleton, Cheshire

References

Citations

Sources

Lists of listed buildings in Staffordshire